The Family Secret is a 1951 American film noir crime film directed by Henry Levin and starring John Derek and Lee J. Cobb.

Plot
Law student David Clark kills best friend Art Bradley in self-defense after an argument. He flees, but later confesses to his father, Howard, a lawyer. The next morning, Howard expects his son to explain what happened to district attorney Redman, but instead David merely asks the DA if he can be of any help after another man, Joe Elsner, is arrested. Elsner is a bookie to whom the dead man owed a debt.

Marie Elsner comes to Howard Clark, asking that he represent her husband in court. David sits by his father's and the defendant's side at the trial. He has always been irresponsible, which is why secretary Lee Pearson keeps resisting David's romantic attentions, even though she is attracted to him. Howard Clark proves a key eyewitness to be a convicted perjurer. It looks like Elsner might be found innocent, but the stress causes him to have a fatal heart attack. David finally realizes he must turn himself in and promises to Lee he will lead a better life.

Cast

 John Derek as David Clark
 Lee J. Cobb as Howard Clark
 Jody Lawrance as Lee Pearson
 Erin O'Brien-Moore as Ellen Clark
 Santos Ortega as District Attorney Redman
 Henry O'Neill as Donald Muir
 Carl Benton Reid as Dr. Steve Reynolds
 Peggy Converse as Sybil Bradley
 Jean Alexander as Vera Stone
 Dorothy Tree as Marie Elsner
 Whit Bissell as Joe Elsner
 Raymond Greenleaf as Henry Archer Sims
 Onslow Stevens as Judge Geoffrey N. Williams

References

External links
 
 
 
 

1951 films
1951 crime drama films
American black-and-white films
American crime drama films
Columbia Pictures films
Film noir
Films scored by George Duning
Films directed by Henry Levin
1950s English-language films
1950s American films